Plastics engineering encompasses the processing, design, development, and manufacture of plastics products. A plastic is a polymeric material that is in a semi-liquid state, having the property of plasticity and exhibiting flow. Plastics engineering encompasses plastics material and plastic machinery. Plastic machinery is the general term for all types of machinery and devices used in the plastics processing industry. The nature of plastic materials poses unique challenges to an engineer. Mechanical properties of plastics are often difficult to quantify, and the plastics engineer has to design a product that meets certain specifications while keeping costs to a minimum. Other properties that the plastics engineer has to address include: outdoor weatherability, thermal properties such as upper use temperature, electrical properties, barrier properties, and resistance to chemical attack.

In plastics engineering, as in most engineering disciplines, the economics of a product plays an important role. The cost of plastic materials ranges from the cheapest commodity plastics used in mass-produced consumer products to very expensive, specialty plastics. The cost of a plastic product is measured in different ways, and the absolute cost of a plastic material is difficult to ascertain. Cost is often measured in price per pound of material, or price per unit volume of material. In many cases, however, it is important for a product to meet certain specifications, and cost could then be measured in price per unit of a property. Price with respect to processibility is often important, as some materials need to be processed at very high temperatures, increasing the amount of cooling time a part needs. In a large production run, cooling time is very expensive.

Some plastics are manufactured from recycled materials but their use in engineering tends to be limited because the consistency of formulation and their physical properties tend to be less consistent. Electrical, electronic equipment, and motor vehicle markets together accounted for 58 percent of engineered plastics demand in 2003. Engineered plastics demand in the US was estimated at $9,702 million in 2007.

A big challenge for plastics engineers is the reduction of the ecological footprints of their products. First attempts like the Vinyloop process can guarantee that a product's primary energy demand is 46 percent lower than conventionally produced PVC. The global warming potential is 39 percent lower.

Plastics engineering specialties
 Consumer plastics
 Medical plastics 
 Automotive plastics
 Recycled or recyclable plastics 
 Biodegradable plastics
 Elastomers/rubber
 Epoxies
 Plastics processing: injection moulding, plastics extrusion, stretch-blow molding, thermoforming, compression molding, calendering, transfer molding, laminating, fiberglass molding, pultrusion, filament winding, vacuum forming, rotational molding
 Ultrasonic welding

See also
 Design of plastic components
 Economics of plastics processing
 Plastic
 Polymer chemistry
 Fields of engineering
 Engineering plastic
 Medical grade silicone

References 

Plastics industry
Plastics applications
Materials science
Engineering disciplines